The February 1922 North Down by-election was held on 21 February 1922.  The by-election was held due to the appointment of the incumbent Ulster Unionist Party MP, Thomas Watters Brown, as a judge to the High Court of Justice in Northern Ireland.  It was won unopposed by the Ulster Unionist Party candidate Henry Hughes Wilson. Wilson was assassinated four months later, leading to the July 1922 North Down by-election.

Result

External links 
A Vision Of Britain Through Time

References

North Down
By-elections to the Parliament of the United Kingdom in County Down constituencies
20th century in County Down
Unopposed by-elections to the Parliament of the United Kingdom in Northern Irish constituencies
1922 elections in Northern Ireland